Pietro Boscaini (22 April 1947 – 1 July 1973) was an Italian freestyle swimmer. He competed at the 1964 and 1968 Olympics in five events in total and reached the finals of the 4 × 100 m medley and 4 × 200 m freestyle relays. He died in a diving accident, aged 26.

References

External links
 
 
 

1947 births
1973 deaths
Italian male swimmers
Italian male freestyle swimmers
Olympic swimmers of Italy
Swimmers at the 1964 Summer Olympics
Swimmers at the 1968 Summer Olympics
Mediterranean Games medalists in swimming
Mediterranean Games gold medalists for Italy
Mediterranean Games silver medalists for Italy
Swimmers at the 1967 Mediterranean Games
20th-century Italian people
21st-century Italian people